Scholfield is a surname. Notable people with the surname include:

Frank Scholfield (1886–1950), English cricketer
Henry Scholfield (1866–1935), Canadian politician
John Scholfield (1834–1893), American politician and jurist
Oliver Scholfield (1993–), Canadian field hockey player
Thomas Scholfield (1894–1964), Australian politician

See also
Schofield (disambiguation)
Scofield (disambiguation)